Guda was a 12th-century nun and illuminator. She was one of the first woman to create a self-portrait in a manuscript, setting a precedent for female medieval illuminators and manuscript writers in the subsequent centuries.

Career 

Guda created a self-portrait in an initial letter in the 12th century Homiliary of St. Bartholomew (now in the Frankfurt am Main, Staatsbibliothek). Her self portrait was symbolically placed in the ninth homily of St. John Chrysostom, a position ideal for witnessing the Second Coming of Christ. Her inscription, "Guda, a sinner, wrote and painted this book," was used to confess to her sinful way, along with describing herself as an artist in hope of increasing her chance for salvation. In addition to serving as a self-portrait, this illustrated initial can also be considered a portrait signature, identifying Guda as both an individual and a scribe.

Legacy 

Scholars today credit Guda with being one of the first women in western civilization to create a signed self-portrait. Although there may have been other female illuminators such as Claricia, a laywoman in a Bavarian Scriptorium, there is no concrete evidence of her exact involvement with these illuminations.

Guda's influence on later nuns in the later centuries is apparent. This is seen through manuscript paintings like "The Heart on the Cross," which depicts a nun exchanging vows with a mystical bridegroom inside the heart of Jesus nailed to a cross. Placing the nun at the heart instead of around the periphery of the painting broke traditional restrictions for female placement within religious paintings, showing that female involvement in illuminations gave the platform to emphasize their role in religious institutions.

Female involvement in manuscript writing and illuminations is best seen with Herrad of Landsberg and her work on the Hortus deliciarum. Herrad's imprint and proof of her authorship is consistent on this manuscript. This is demonstrated through the omitting and inclusion of religious writing depending on her liking, editing sources to make the manuscript more accessible for the nuns of the Hohenbourg Abbey, and even criticisms of the clergy as seen in the removed depiction of hell that she attempted to include. Herrad's work in this manuscript built on the foundation that Guda set for women to show expression, identity, and call for reform via manuscripts and illuminations.

Further demonstrations of calls for reform via illuminations and manuscripts are seen through 15th century nuns and their orders. Sister Magdalena Kremerin wrote about founding mothers having difficulties incorporating women's communities into the Dominican Order, leading to inspiration for a successful protest directed at the pope that led to their acceptance. The altered illuminations in manuscripts from nuns at St. Maria Magdalena put themselves more front and center in various religious works, calling for a change in how valued the nuns were in their order, along trying to strengthen their connection with God. Manuscript writing even preserved the existence of these reformed orders, as seen with the nuns of Kremerin's order who were able to fend off Duke Eberhard's attempts to sabotage their advocacy for change by compiling a letter towards nobles and burghers that convinced them to defend their order against the Duke.

Guda's contribution towards female Medieval illumination and manuscript writing not only opened up new avenues for expression and identity that was not possible before, but also led the way towards social, political, and religious reform through these tools.

References 

Manuscript illuminators
12th-century German nuns
Romanesque artists
German women artists
Year of birth unknown
Year of death unknown
12th-century women artists
12th-century German artists
Self-portraits